Grupo Desportivo da Lagoa, commonly known as Lagoa, is a Portuguese football club from the municipality of Lagoa. The club was founded in 1971. The club currently plays at the Estádio Capitão Josino da Costa which holds a seating capacity of 1000. The club currently plays in the Algarve League First Division after being relegated from the national Third Division in season 2012 – 2013.

References

External links
 Stats and profile at Zerozero
 Stats at ForaDeJogo

Football clubs in Portugal
Association football clubs established in 1971
1971 establishments in Portugal